Face First is the sixth album by jazz fusion band Tribal Tech. It was released in 1993. The album is more improvisational than the band's previous works, and features elements of funk, bop and blues. "Boat Gig" is the only track on the album that contains singing, with vocals by drummer Kirk Covington.

Track listing

Personnel
Scott Henderson – guitar
Gary Willis – fretless bass
Scott Kinsey – keyboards
Kirk Covington – drums, vocals

References

Tribal Tech albums
1993 albums